Pirševo is a small settlement in the Tuhinj Valley in the Municipality of Kamnik in the Upper Carniola region of Slovenia.

References

External links
Pirševo on Geopedia

Populated places in the Municipality of Kamnik